Théo Mahy, full name Théo Mahy-Ma-Somga, (born November 18, 1989, Paris, France) is an independent film director, producer, and screenwriter. Since 2012, he has been living and working in the United States. His production company, L'Atelier Productions, is based in Los Angeles.  He is French borne with family origins from Cameroon. His international background serves as inspiration for his filmmaking as he often uses his experiences as a descendant of immigrants as well as his French background to make social commentary on modern day society. He is most well known for his film projects An American Life, Awakened, The Audience starring Ashlei Sharpe Chestnut, and All We have Left starring Dree Hemingway.

Biography 
Mahy was borne in Paris. He directed his first short film, Lost in Reality, at age 14. He attended Paul Cézanne University in Aix-en-Provence were he studied law. He moved to New York City in 2012 to pursue of a career in filmmaking. He is currently based in Los Angeles. He has worked in television as a producer and director and in film as a director, producer, and screenwriter.

Filmography

Film

Television

Featuring film festivals and accolades

Film festivals and accolades

References

External links 

French film directors
French film producers
Living people
1989 births